"Back Down South" (also called "Southbound") is a song by American rock band Kings of Leon from their 2010 album Come Around Sundown. It was released as the third and final single from the album May 17, 2011.

Music video
A music video to accompany the release of "Back Down South" was first released onto YouTube on May 27, 2011 at a total length of four minutes and five seconds. It was directed by Casey McGrath with part of the filming in Nashville, TN and the other half in Hampshire, TN. William Goodman of Spin described the video as "an advert for their country way of life."

Reception
Scott Shelter from PopCrush gave the song an 8/10 grade, commenting, "With a dash of twang and an intentional down-home appeal, ‘Back Down South’ wouldn’t sound out of place at a country music festival or awards show. It’s a welcome change of pace from the arena-rock direction of the band’s recent music."

Live performances
Kings of Leon first performed the song during their summer tour 2010. They also performed it on Later... with Jools Holland.

Track listings
Digital download
"Back Down South" – 4:01

Credits and personnel
Kings of Leon
Caleb Followill - Vocals and guitar - Gibson PR-720S
Matthew Followill - Lead guitar and Lap steel guitar - Gibson Guitar
Jared Followill - Bass guitar - Gibson Thunderbird
Nathan Followill - Drums, percussion, backing vocals - DW Drums
 Robert Mallory - Fiddle
 Angela Petraglia and Liam O'Neil - Organ - Hammond B3
Producers – Angelo Petraglia, Jacquire King
Lyrics – Caleb Followill, Nathan Followill, Jared Followill, Matthew Followill
Label – RCA Records

Chart performance

References

2011 singles
Kings of Leon songs
Rock ballads
Songs written by Matthew Followill
Songs written by Jared Followill
Songs written by Nathan Followill
Songs written by Caleb Followill
Song recordings produced by Jacquire King
RCA Records singles
Songs about the American South